Whanganui may refer to various places in New Zealand:
Whanganui, also spelled "Wanganui", a city, Manawatu-Wanganui Region
Whanganui (New Zealand electorate), formerly spelled Wanganui
Whanganui District, a district, Manawatu-Wanganui Region
Whanganui Island, Waikato Region
Whanganui National Park, Manawatu-Wanganui Region
Whanganui River, Manawatu-Wanganui Region
Te Whanganui a Hei or Cathedral Cove, Coromandel 
Te Whanganui a Tara or Wellington Harbour

See also
Wanganui River, South Island
Wanganui and Rangitikei, a past electorate